Gemmulimitra is a genus of sea snails, marine gastropod mollusks in the family Mitridae.

Species
Species within the genus Gemmulimitra include:

 Gemmulimitra aliciae  (Poppe, Tagaro & R. Salisbury, 2009)
 Gemmulimitra apprimapex (Poppe, Tagaro & R. Salisbury, 2009)
 Gemmulimitra avenacea (Reeve, 1845)
 Gemmulimitra boucheti (Cernohorsky, 1988)
 Gemmulimitra duplilirata (Reeve, 1845)
 Gemmulimitra edgari (Poppe, Tagaro & R. Salisbury, 2009)
 Gemmulimitra gemma S.-I Huang & Q.-Y. Chuo, 2019
 Gemmulimitra gonatophora (Sturany, 1903)
 Gemmulimitra hansturneri (E. Guillot de Suduiraut & E. G. Guillot de Suduiraut, 2009)
 Gemmulimitra margaritata (Poppe, Tagaro & R. Salisbury, 2009)
 Gemmulimitra neocaledonica Fedosov, Herrmann, Kantor & Bouchet, 2018
 Gemmulimitra picardali S.-I Huang & Q.-Y. Chuo, 2019
 Gemmulimitra rubiginosa (Reeve, 1844)
 Gemmulimitra solanderi (Reeve, 1844)
 Gemmulimitra strongae (Poppe, Tagaro & R. Salisbury, 2009)

References

External links
 Fedosov A., Puillandre N., Herrmann M., Kantor Yu., Oliverio M., Dgebuadze P., Modica M.V. & Bouchet P. (2018). The collapse of Mitra: molecular systematics and morphology of the Mitridae (Gastropoda: Neogastropoda). Zoological Journal of the Linnean Society. 183(2): 253-337

 
Mitridae
Gastropod genera